Edward James Thompson (born 26 April 1974 in York, England) is a British auto racing driver. He has twice been champion of the British Touring Car Championship (BTCC), and was third in the 2007 World Touring Car Championship.

Racing career

British Touring Car Championship

Thompson started racing in the BTCC in a privately entered Peugeot 405 in 1994, his performances earning him a factory Vauxhall drive for 1995. He became the youngest ever race-winner that year, also taking two pole positions, before his season was cut short by a crash at Knockhill giving him an eye injury. 1996 was a transitional year with the new Vauxhall Vectra, although Thompson took a victory at Snetterton, moving up from fifth in a two-lap burst in which Roberto Ravaglia and Rickard Rydell collided, Joachim Winkelhock spun, and Alain Menu broke down.

In 1997, Thompson joined Honda, finishing fifth in the championship in 1997, third in 1998, and fourth in 1999. He missed two rounds through a concussion sustained in a 12G backwards accident at Brands Hatch in 2000, but returned to racing at Knockhill, and was able to finish ninth, having been pre-season favourite for the title.

When Honda pulled out for 2001, Thompson joined Team Egg Sport, racing their Vauxhall to four wins and third overall – enough to earn him a return to the factory Vauxhall team for 2002, which featured a titanic three-year battle with team-mate Yvan Muller in their dominant Astra. Thompson was BTCC champion in both 2002 and 2004, and was second in 2003 behind Muller.

For 2006, Thompson joined Jason Plato at SEAT Sport UK. He did this at the same time as competing in the WTCC, meaning he had to skip some BTCC rounds when they clashed with World touring car races, in the second SEAT Sport UK car, though at Silverstone for the final round he used his Red Bull-backed WTCC car. After competing in the first nine races, he was actually ahead of BTCC team leader Plato. Despite having to yield the victory to Plato at Croft, he finished sixth overall, scoring more points per entry than any other SEAT driver; although Plato failed to start two races due to accident damage.

For 2009, rumours had placed Thompson with a possible return to the BTCC after discussions with Team Dynamics to race one of their Honda Civics. He also tested a Tempus Sport Chevrolet Lacetti and a Motorbase Performance BMW 320si. However, his name was missing from the pre-season entry list, and it was later announced he would spend another year in the Danish series. It was then announced in April, prior to the Thruxton round that he would return to the BTCC, replacing Gordon Shedden. He collected a double win at Donington Park, and added a third win at Oulton Park. After the round at Knockhill, Thompson was replaced by ex-Formula One driver Johnny Herbert due to clashes with his commitments in the WTCC and V8 Supercars.

Thompson was chosen as the development driver for the new Next Generation Touring Car regulations, and participated in first practice for the 2010 season finale at Brands Hatch in a prototype car based on a Toyota Avensis.

He returned to racing for the 2011 season finale with Airwaves Racing to support Mat Jackson's title bid. The weekend did not go well with two retirements in the first two races, but a single point for fastest lap in the last race was to be the best result of the weekend.

World Touring Car Championship
For 2005, Thompson attempted a new challenge in the World Touring Car Championship, with Alfa Romeo. His first WTCC season opened with a win, but was not a huge success overall. He finished the season eighth in the standings. Alfa Romeo pulled out of the WTCC at the end of the season, leaving Thompson's future uncertain.

For 2006 he moved to SEAT Sport, the team which he would also drive for in that year's BTCC. Within the first six races, Thompson finished on the podium three times but in the second half of the season he finished in the points on only three occasions. In a team that featured a top driver lineup including Yvan Muller and Gabriele Tarquini, he finished eighth in the Drivers Championship.

In 2007, Thompson rejoined Alfa Romeo in the WTCC run by N.Technology. Although his aged Alfa Romeo 156 was not as well developed as his works-backed rivals, he fought for the championship title until the final race and ended the season in third place.

In 2008 he competed for N.Technology in a Honda Accord Euro R in the WTCC. He also drove an Accord in the Danish Touring Car Championship. After missing the first two WTCC meetings, the team struggled to develop the car competitively. However, the team steadily worked on the car over the season and scored their first win of the season at Imola. However, N.Technology announced its withdrawal at the end of the year, leaving Thompson without a drive.

He also returned to the WTCC with Lada Sport in July 2009, driving their new Priora model. He participated in five events with Lada Sport, achieving a best result of sixth place in both races at Imola. Thompson was unable to participate in the final event at Macau following a heavy collision in qualifying with the stationary car of Stefano D'Aste.

Thompson returned to the WTCC in 2012 with Lada Sport driving a Lada Granta WTCC at both the Race of Hungary and the Race of Portugal.

He will return to the WTCC in 2013, driving a Lada Granta WTCC full-time with Lada Sport Lukoil alongside new teammate Aleksei Dudukalo. During qualifying for the Race of Italy he was hit by Dudukalo who had missed the braking point for the first chicane. Thompson was already through to Q2 and he returned to the pits for repairs before taking part in the second session. He set the ninth fastest time which would give him a front row start when the grid was reversed for race two. Lada later withdrew both of their cars prior to the races as neither could be repaired in time to participate.

European Touring Car Cup
He won the 2009 European Touring Car Cup at the Circuito Vasco Sameiro near Braga in Portugal, driving a Honda Accord for Hartmann Honda Racing.

In 2010 he revealed a schedule of ETCC, the new-for-2010 Scandinavian Touring Car Cup and DTC, Danish Touring Car Championship. He won the season opener of ETCC and led the championship, but a few days before the Scandinavian season kicked off, he parted ways with Danish team Hartmann Honda Racing. The two got back together heading for the second round of ETCC. Thompson successfully defended his ETCC title in 2010.

Scandinavian Touring Car Championship
In 2011, he raced in the Scandinavian Touring Car Championship for Polestar Racing in their Volvo C30. He left the team in the middle of season, citing differences in the development direction of the car as the reason for the departure. His replacement was later announced at WTCC driver Gabriele Tarquini.

Race of Champions
After Jenson Button pulled out of the 2006 Race of Champions, Thompson was announced as his replacement on 13 December 2006. He competed for the British team with fellow touring car driver Andy Priaulx on 16 December 2006.

Racing record

Complete British Touring Car Championship results
(key) Races in bold indicate pole position (1 point awarded – 1996–2002 all races, 2003–present just for first race) Races in italics indicate fastest lap (1 point awarded – 2001–present all races) * signifies that driver lead race for at least one lap (1 point awarded – 1998–2002 just for feature race, 2003–present all races)

Complete Super Tourenwagen Cup results
(key) (Races in bold indicate pole position) (Races in italics indicate fastest lap)

Complete Deutsche Tourenwagen Masters results
(key) (Races in bold indicate pole position) (Races in italics indicate fastest lap)

Complete European Touring Car Championship results
(key) (Races in bold indicate pole position) (Races in italics indicate fastest lap)

Complete World Touring Car Championship results
(key) (Races in bold indicate pole position) (Races in italics indicate fastest lap)

† Driver did not finish the race, but was classified as he completed over 90% of the race distance.

Complete V8 Supercar Championship results

Complete Scandinavian Touring Car Championship results
(key) (Races in bold indicate pole position) (Races in italics indicate fastest lap)

Complete World Touring Car Cup results
(key) (Races in bold indicate pole position) (Races in italics indicate fastest lap)

Complete Bathurst 1000 results

References

External links

 
 
Lada Sport Official website (in Russian)
Lada Sport Official Greek website

1974 births
Living people
Sportspeople from York
People educated at St Peter's School, York
English racing drivers
British Touring Car Championship drivers
British Touring Car Championship Champions
Danish Touring Car Championship drivers
European Touring Car Championship drivers
European Touring Car Cup drivers
World Touring Car Championship drivers
World Touring Car Cup drivers
Deutsche Tourenwagen Masters drivers
Abt Sportsline drivers
Cupra Racing drivers